Acheilognathus imfasciodorsalis is a species of freshwater ray-finned fish in the genus Acheilognathus.  It is endemic to Vietnam.

References

Acheilognathus
Fish described in 2001
Fish of Vietnam